Hamilton Dawson Jukes (28 May 1895 – 8 January 1951) was a British ice hockey player who competed in the 1924 Winter Olympics.

Born in Winnipeg, Manitoba, he was a member of the British ice hockey team, which won the bronze medal. He committed suicide in San Diego, California in 1951.

References

External links
profile

1895 births
1951 suicides
British people of Canadian descent
Canadian ice hockey players
Canadian people of British descent
Ice hockey players at the 1924 Winter Olympics
Olympic bronze medallists for Great Britain
Olympic ice hockey players of Great Britain
Olympic medalists in ice hockey
Ice hockey people from Winnipeg
Medalists at the 1924 Winter Olympics
Suicides by firearm in California